The National Hedgelaying Society is the only British charity devoted to the art of hedgelaying and the restoration and creation of hedgerows. The society runs hedgelaying competitions and exhibitions in the UK, and an optional accreditation scheme for hedgelayers. Charles III is a patron of the organization, and in December 2021 he presented awards on behalf of the society at Highgrove estate.

References

External links
Official website

Fences
Organisations based in the United Kingdom